"Prisoner" is the second track and second single from 311's 1997 album Transistor. When being interviewed in 1999, SA Martinez stated that "Prisoner" is his favorite 311 song. The song is about being trapped in a material plane and about someone not being themselves.

Music video

The music video shows a woman going inside a cold pool. With the lid to the pool closed, the band members are standing around in what looks like a basement, singing the song with various men in uniforms seen in the background. Clips of the woman in the pool is also occasionally seen. Later on, the band members are seen in that same pool. The music video for "Prisoner" was shot in Los Angeles, California.

Track listing

"Prisoner" (album version) - 2:50
"Transistor" (Single Malt Mix) - 3:04
"Prisoner" (DJ Spina & Tickla Remix) - 2:50
"Prisoner" (DJ Sean Perry Mix) - 2:50

Charts

References 

1997 singles
311 (band) songs
1997 songs
Songs written by Nick Hexum